The Eubians (also called Traders) refers to the fictional people of the Eubian Concord in the Saga of the Skolian Empire by Catherine Asaro. They are often portrayed as antagonists in those novels, enemy to the rivaling Skolian Empire.

Eubian Concord is an interstellar civilization consisting of several thousand planets, with an economy based on slavery. Named after its founder Eube Qox, the Concord is governed by an emperor, who acts as an absolute ruler. So far all five emperors have been from the House of Qox, direct descendants of Eube Qox, with Eube being the first emperor, followed by Jaibriol I, Ur, Jaibriol II and Jaibriol III.

Population
Several thousand Aristos occupy the highest echelon of Eubian society, controlling the government, wealth and the military. They are the only free people in the Concord, all other Eubians are slaves. The two trillion majority of the population are called taskmakers, and have varying degrees of freedom. The lowest echelon of the Eubian Concord comprises a few thousand providers, who are psions enslaved by the Aristos, both for pleasure and for transcendence.

Aristos
Aristos are the ruling class of Eubian Concord. They are in general extremely wealthy and own entire worlds inclusive the enslaved inhabitants. The most known Aristo noble Houses are the Qox, Muze, Xir, Iquar, Taratus, Kaliga and Raziquon. Because Aristos intermarry quite often, most of the Houses are already closely related to each other.

The appearance of Aristos is marked by their characteristic red eyes and black shimmering hair. His or her looks is very important for an Aristo, as it may be useful for gaining influential position. It belongs to good manners to look good, young and well shaped. If an Aristo is old, fat or ugly, it is recommended to visit a body sculptor, who can get people in top form with the help of modern plastic surgery.

Aristos form the top-most echelon of Eubian society and comprise three main categories:
 Highton – control the government and military
 Diamond – manage commerce and production
 Silicate – produce the means of pleasure

As a race, Aristos are an unfortunate result of the Rhon project. Led by a geneticist named Hezahr Rhon, this project was originally started to produce a psion who would possess strong empathic and telepathic abilities but wouldn't suffer when experiencing the unpleasant emotions of others, like pain or fear.

The outcome was however a race of people who not only lack empathic or telepathic abilities, but are also utterly devoid of compassion. Their brains interpret pain of others (especially of psions) as pleasure, which makes them the ultimate sadists. The stronger pain a psion feels, the more pleasure it means for an Aristo.

The elevated sense of ecstasy experienced by Aristos when causing pain to psions is called transcendence. This transcendence is considered normal and appropriate among Aristos, who are raised to believe that the pleasure obtained from torturing telepaths is their inherent right. There are however a few exceptions who decided to have their Kyle Afferent Body or KAB (the microscopic organ in their brain that is responsible for their need for transcendence) removed. Those must keep their decision secret, as knowledge of this would make them to outcasts in the Aristo society.

Aristos see themselves as kind, good-hearted, moral, noble and merciful. They take care of their slaves, who in their opinion would not survive a single minute without the guidance of their masters. Their psionic pleasure slaves are supposed to feel "honored" by being allowed to help their owners reaching transcendence. From an Aristo point of view every non-Aristo is less than a human, thus incapable of independent thinking and actions and should be subject to Aristos. That inhabitants of the Skolian Empire and the Allied worlds survive without having an owner is an abomination according to Aristo standards.

Half-breeds
Besides their legitimate offspring, many Aristos (both men and women) also have children with their providers. Such children do not manifest the empathic and telepathic abilities of their psion parent, as the necessary genes must come from both parents. They however mostly inherit from their Aristo parent the defective KAB resulting in the need for transcendence. Prevalence of Aristo genes decreases with every next generation of part-Aristos mixing with non-Aristos. Thus a child or grandchild of a half-Aristo may already have a "normal" mind.

All children from an Aristo–provider union are considered slaves, rated as taskmakers. Many Aristos take pride in giving their taskmaker offspring good education, wealth and profitable and influential jobs. Rare attempts to pass off such child as a member of an Aristo caste are major crimes according to Eubian law. It is an Aristo tradition to give their taskmaker children names that reflect their Aristo genitor – so Xirson is a son of an Aristo called Xir, Qoxdaughter is daughter of Qox, etc.

Taskmakers
In general, taskmakers are all Eubian slaves who are not psions. In fact, the population of Eubian Concord consists mainly of taskmakers, who complete all necessary tasks in the society. Every taskmaker has an occupation to which he/she has been trained for. The many various jobs taskmakers can execute include all possible trades, jobs of technicians, engineers, agriculturists, medical staff including specialized doctors, military personnel and officers etc.

Many taskmakers, especially those who occupy influential jobs in state administration or army, are of mixed Aristo-provider blood. In general, the more significant Aristo ancestry a taskmaker has, the more prestigious position is he/she likely to gain. High status taskmakers may actually become factory directors, starship captains or administrators of entire planets, are allowed to keep property, even have slaves on their own.

Lots of taskmakers live ordinary, comfortable lives and have a higher standard of living than their counterparts in the Skolian Empire. Nevertheless, they remain slaves and their entire life could be forfeit at the decision of an Aristo.

Razers are taskmakers who act as bodyguards for the highest Aristo nobility and receive extensive bioenhancements including cybernetic implants, making them the Eubian counterparts of the Skolian Jagernauts. Razers are the only slaves who are not supposed to kneel in front of an Aristo because this may influence their ability to protect their owner.

Providers
Providers are Eubian sex slaves, psions who live solely for one purpose – to provide empathic input for their Aristo masters with their suffering during torture, so that the Aristo may reach the elevated state of transcendence. As such, providers are on the lowest echelon of Eubian society. Sexual relationships with providers are not considered infidelity in Eubian culture because they are just slaves. In fact, an Aristo husband might give a provider to his wife as a present, and a host might entertain his guests by offering them his providers.

Providers are rare and very expensive, especially the ones with strongest empathic abilities. Their main task is to look extremely good, suffer without complaining and please their master in any possible way. To achieve perfection in their duties, providers are raised in special pavilions where they get "proper" education. Different lines of providers are bred for their specific physical and mental attributes like beauty or heightened sensual response. An early attempt to create a line of extremely strong empathic providers lead unintentionally to the rise of the Skolian ruling family, the Ruby Dynasty.

Breeding psions is however an insufficient source for providers and other means are needed to satisfy the still increasing demands of Eubian market. As a solution, Eubian pirate ships make illegal raids on Skolian and Allied ships, kidnapping psions with high KAB Rating and selling them into slavery.

History
Like Skolians, the Eubians also trace back their roots to the ancient Ruby Empire, ruled by psionic warrior queens. Yet unlike Skolians, who refer to themselves as to the successors of the Ruby Empire, Eubians choose their own way, founding a civilization based on slavery, where psions are considered inferior.

Military
The military of Eubian Concord is comprised in Eubian Space Command (ESComm). Duties of commanding ESComm are shared by two influential Highton Aristo top officers, so-called Joint Commanders, who are appointed directly by the emperor. ESComm has a powerful fleet, which easily outnumbers the fleets of both Skolians and Allieds. The fleet consists of various types of warships, from small Solo and Stinger fighters and to huge warrior ships or floating cities. During the Radiance War, ESComm has gathered 2,000,000 ships to conquer a main Skolian base, the Onyx Platform.

ESComm has many military bases scattered across the whole Concord, particularly in the strategic Platinum sector. Another highly defended ESComm post is Sphinx Sector Rim Base (SSRB), which is the current residence of the Third Lock, captured by ESComm during the Radiance War. The best defended place in Eubian Concord is the central world Eube's Glory.

Although the Eubian army is larger and has more resources, attempts to conquer enemy Skolian Empire always failed due to the Skolian psiberweb, which enables Skolians virtual instantaneous communication, giving them a big advantage. Clumsy attempts have been made by Providers working under General Barthol Iquar to access and alter Kyle space with limited success.

Law
In Eubian Concord slavery is considered legal and Aristos are allowed to decide about life and death of their slaves. Despite the fact that it is officially forbidden to gain new slaves with illegal raids in Allied and Skolian territory, an unwritten law says that it is allowed to obtain a slave by any possible means. Actually, an Aristo who breaks laws is not likely to receive punishment, unless he/she falls into disfavour of the emperor.

Crimes of slaves are not handled with such benevolence. Punishment for any slave who commits a crime or does not obey orders can be death or torture, eventually brain-washing. Longing for freedom is not allowed for slaves. Occasional taskmaker uprisings are suppressed very strictly, their Aristo owners even don't recoil from wiping out the entire population of a rebelling planet. The only chance for a slave to live in freedom is therefore an escape in Skolian or Allied territory.

Language
Common language for inhabitants of the many thousand different planets, which are part of Eubian Concord is called Eubic. Language of the ruling Aristo caste is Highton. In Highton speech, direct language is considered rude, and all Highton speakers use subtle and multi-layered language. Direct speech is only allowed in a conversation of family members or if a Highton speaks with a member of the lower classes (as slaves are not supposed to understand the exalted Highton language).

Eube's Glory 

Eube's Glory, often called just Glory, is the Eubian homeworld, seat of the government. The planet was designed according to the wishes of Eube Qox, after whom it was named. Glory has a radius three times Earth's and gravity of 92% in comparison to Earth. There are fourteen moons in the star system of Glory, most of which have no names, only numbers. They get their names after wives of Eubian emperors, that's why most of them are unnamed yet (there haven't been so many emperors and empresses). For the present, only five moons with names exist – Mirella, Zara, Viquara, Prism and Tarquine.

See also

 The Moon's Shadow – this book centers on Jaibriol III and introduces readers to Eubian society
 The Radiant Seas – describes the interstellar Radiance War
 The Ruby Dice – Direct sequel to The Moon's Shadow, continues Jaibriol III's rule
 Carnelians – Set three months after The Ruby Dice, begins peace negotiations between Eube and Skolia

Saga of the Skolian Empire